Second wind is a phenomenon in endurance sports, such as marathons or road running (as well as other sports), whereby an athlete who is out of breath and too tired to continue (known as "hitting the wall"), suddenly finds the strength to press on at top performance with less exertion. The feeling may be similar to that of a "runner's high", the most obvious difference being that the runner's high occurs after the race is over.

In experienced athletes, "hitting the wall" is conventionally believed to be due to the body's glycogen stores being depleted, with "second wind" occurring when fatty acids become the predominant source for energy. The delay between "hitting the wall" and "second wind" occurring, has to do with the slow speed of which Fatty Acids sufficiently produce ATP (energy); with fatty acids taking approximately 10 minutes, whereas muscle glycogen is considerably faster at about 30 seconds. Some scientists believe the second wind to be a result of the body finding the proper balance of oxygen to counteract the buildup of lactic acid in the muscles. Others claim second winds are due to endorphin production.

Heavy breathing during exercise is also to provide cooling for the body. After some time the veins and capillaries dilate and cooling takes place more through the skin, so less heavy breathing is needed.   The increase in the temperature of the skin can be felt at the same time as the "second wind" takes place.

Documented experiences of the second wind go back at least 100 years, when it was taken to be a commonly held fact of exercise. The phenomenon has come to be used as a metaphor for continuing on with renewed energy past the point thought to be one's prime, whether in other sports, careers, or life in general.

A second wind phenomenon is also seen in some medical conditions, such as McArdle Disease (GSD-V) and Phosphoglucomutase Deficiency (CDG1T/GSD-XIV). Unlike non-affected individuals that have to do long-distance running to deplete their muscle glycogen, in GSD-V individuals their muscle glycogen is unavailable, so second wind is achieved after 6–10 minutes of light-moderate aerobic activity (such as walking without an incline). In GSD-V, due to a glycolytic block, there is an energy shortage in the muscle cells after the phosphagen system has been depleted. Exercise intolerance such as muscle fatigue and pain, an inappropriate rapid heart rate (sinus tachycardia) in response to exercise, and tachypnea is experienced until sufficient energy is produced via oxidative phosphorylation, primarily from Free Fatty Acids.

Oxidative phosphorylation by Free Fatty Acids is more easily achievable for light-moderate aerobic activity, as high-intensity (fast-paced) aerobic activity relies more on muscle glycogen (unavailable in GSD-V), due to its high ATP consumption. Oxidative phosphorylation by Free Fatty Acids is not achievable with isometric and other anaerobic activity (such as lifting weights), as contracted muscles restricts blood flow (leaving oxygen and blood borne fuels unable to be delivered to muscle cells adequately for oxidative phosphorylation). The second wind phenomenon in GSD-V individuals can be demonstrated by measuring heart rate during a 12 Minute Walk Test. A "Third Wind" phenomenon is also seen in GSD-V individuals, where after approximately 2 hours, they see a further improvement of symptoms as the body becomes even more fat adapted.

Hypotheses

Metabolic switching
When non-aerobic glycogen metabolism is insufficient to meet energy demands, physiologic mechanisms utilize alternative sources of energy such as fatty acids and proteins via aerobic respiration. Second-wind phenomena in metabolic disorders such as McArdle's disease are attributed to this metabolic switch and the same or a similar phenomenon may occur in healthy individuals (see symptoms of McArdle's disease).

Lactic acid
Muscular exercise as well as other cellular functions requires oxygen to produce ATP and properly function. This normal function is called aerobic metabolism and does not produce lactic acid if enough oxygen is present. During heavy exercise such as long distance running or any demanding exercise, the body's need for oxygen to produce energy is higher than the oxygen supplied in the blood from respiration. Anaerobic metabolism to some degree then takes place in the muscle and this less ideal energy production produces lactic acid as a waste metabolite. If the oxygen supply is not soon restored, this may lead to accumulation of lactic acid.

This is the case even without exercise in people with respiratory disease, challenged circulation of blood to parts of the body or any other situation when oxygen cannot be supplied to the tissues involved.

Some people's bodies may take more time than others to be able to balance the amount of oxygen they need to counteract the lactic acid. This theory of the second wind posits that, by pushing past the point of pain and exhaustion, runners may give their systems enough time to warm up and begin to use the oxygen to its fullest potential. For this reason, well-conditioned Olympic-level runners do not generally experience a second wind (or they experience it much sooner) because their bodies are trained to perform properly from the start of the race.

The idea of "properly trained" athlete delves into the theory of how an amateur athlete can train his or her body to increase the aerobic capacity or aerobic metabolism. A big push in Ironman Triathlon ten years ago introduced the idea of heart rate training and "tricking" one's body into staying in an aerobic metabolic state for longer periods of time.  This idea is widely accepted and incorporated into many Ironman Triathlon training programs.

Endorphins
Endorphins are credited as the cause of the feeling of euphoria and wellbeing found in many forms of exercise, so proponents of this theory believe that the second wind is caused by their early release. Many of these proponents feel that the second wind is very closely related to—or even interchangeable with—the runner's high.

See also 

 "Hitting the Wall"
 McArdle Disease (GSD-V)
 Metabolic Myopathies

External links 

 IamGSD - International Association for Muscle Glycogen Storage Disease
 Training Support - IamGSD resources for "Second Wind," details and printouts for the 12 MWT, and physical training guidelines in McArdle Disease (GSD-V)
 12 Minute Walk Test in McArdle Disease - IamGSD Videos. A video of the 12 MWT demonstrating "Second Wind" using a treadmill and measuring heart rate of an individual with McArdle Disease (GSD-V)

References

Running
Sport of athletics terminology
Physiology